Trihøene  is a mountain in Innlandet county, Norway. The mountain lies along the border between the municipalities of Skjåk and Lesja. Trihøene has three main peaks (hence the name) and the tallest peak is also known as Storhøi.

See also
List of mountains of Norway

References

Mountains of Innlandet
Lesja
Skjåk